Analipseos (literally Ascension) is an under-construction metro station serving Thessaloniki Metro's Line 1 and Line 2. It is expected to enter service in 2023.
This station also appears in the 1988 Thessaloniki Metro proposal.

References

See also
List of Thessaloniki Metro stations

Thessaloniki Metro